John Sprague may refer to:

 John W. Sprague (1817–1893), American soldier and railroad executive
 John Allison Sprague (1844–1907), Ontario farmer and political figure